Ace of Aces: Wingleader is a board game published in 1988 by Nova Game Designs.

Contents
Wingleader is a game in which the system from Ace of Aces is updated to the World War II era.

Reception
Lee Brimmicombe-Wood reviewed Wingleader for Games International magazine, and gave it 4 stars out of 5, and stated that "for those wishing some quick, fun entertainment that is accessible to novice and non-gamers, I can wholeheartedly recommend this one. Chocks Away!"

Reviews
Fire & Movement #72

References

Board games introduced in 1988
Nova Game Designs games